Kyle David Cody (born August 9, 1994) is an American professional baseball pitcher in the Texas Rangers organization. He made his Major League Baseball (MLB) debut in 2020. He played college baseball for the Kentucky Wildcats of the University of Kentucky.

Amateur career
Cody attended McDonell Central Catholic High School in Chippewa Falls, Wisconsin. He played for the baseball team, and was named the Gatorade Wisconsin Baseball Player of the Year in 2012, his senior year. He also starred for the school's basketball team, being named the Cloverbelt Conference's Player of the Year as a senior, and played for the school's gridiron football team as their quarterback. He was selected as the 2011-12 recipient of the Pat Richter Award presented by WisSports.net as the Triple Play Triple Threat Male Athlete of the Year.

The Philadelphia Phillies selected Cody in the 33rd round of the 2012 MLB Draft. He chose not to sign, and instead enrolled at the University of Kentucky to play college baseball for the Kentucky Wildcats. He pitched in the bullpen in 2014. In 2014, he played collegiate summer baseball with the Wareham Gatemen of the Cape Cod Baseball League, where he was named a league all-star. Before the start of the 2015 college season, Cody was named an All-American. Cody produced a 4–4 record with a 4.91 ERA and 63 strikeouts over 66 innings in 2015.

The Minnesota Twins selected Cody with the 73rd overall selection in the 2015 MLB draft. Cody and the Twins did not come to terms on a contract, and Cody returned to Kentucky for his senior year. He produced a 6–2 record with a 3.35 ERA and 75 strikeouts in  innings in 2016.

Professional career
The Texas Rangers then selected Cody in the sixth round, with the 189th overall selection, of the 2016 MLB draft. Cody signed and made his professional debut with the Spokane Indians where he went 2–5 with a 5.13 ERA over  innings. He split 2017 between the Hickory Crawdads and the Down East Wood Ducks, posting a combined 9–6 record with a 2.64 ERA over 126 innings between both clubs. He was named the Texas Rangers Nolan Ryan Pitcher of the Year for 2017.

Cody missed the first three months of the 2018 season as he tried to rehab through right elbow inflammation. He made two rehab outings with the AZL Rangers in July, throwing 5 scoreless innings. He underwent Tommy John surgery on July 19, 2018, and missed the remainder of the 2018 season. Cody missed the entire 2019 season as he continued to rehabilitate following surgery.

Cody was added to the Rangers 40–man roster following the 2019 season. On August 20, 2020, Cody was promoted to the major leagues. He made his major league debut the next day against the Seattle Mariners, pitching a scoreless inning of relief. Cody was named the Rangers Player of the Month for September 2020, and finished his first MLB campaign after posting a 1–1 record with a 1.59 ERA and 18 strikeouts over  innings.

Cody opened 2021 by going 0–2 with a 7.94 ERA over  innings for Texas. On May 9, 2021, Cody was placed on the 60-day injured list with right shoulder inflammation. On September 29, 2021, Texas announced that Cody had undergone debridement surgery of the labrum in his right shoulder, and that he would miss the first half of 2022 as well. On November 19, 2021, Cody was designated for assignment and outrighted off the Rangers active roster. Cody split the 2022 season between the ACL Rangers and the Round Rock Express of the Triple-A Pacific Coast League once he returned from injury, going a combined 1–0 with a 2.67 ERA and 39 strikeouts over  innings.

Personal life
Kyle is the youngest of four children of Gene and Jackie Cody. When Kyle was three years old, he was a passenger in an auto accident which took the life of his four-year-old brother Tyler.

References

External links

Kentucky Wildcats bio

1994 births
Living people
People from Chippewa Falls, Wisconsin
Baseball players from Wisconsin
Major League Baseball pitchers
Texas Rangers players
Kentucky Wildcats baseball players
Wareham Gatemen players
Arizona League Rangers players
Spokane Indians players
Hickory Crawdads players
Down East Wood Ducks players
Arizona Complex League Rangers players
Round Rock Express players